Pauline Allen,  (born 23 February 1948) is an Australian scholar of early Christianity. She is Research Professor of Early Christian Studies and the Director of the Centre for Early Christian Studies at the Australian Catholic University.

Honours
In 1996 Allen was elected a Fellow of the Australian Academy of the Humanities, while in July 2016, she was elected a corresponding Fellow of the British Academy (FBA).

Selected works

References

1948 births
Living people
Roman Catholic biblical scholars
Australian Roman Catholics
Academic staff of the Australian Catholic University
Corresponding Fellows of the British Academy
Fellows of the Australian Academy of the Humanities
Historians of Christianity
Australian historians of religion
Female biblical scholars